North Sentinel Island is one of the Andaman Islands, an Indian archipelago in the Bay of Bengal which also includes South Sentinel Island. It is home to the Sentinelese, an indigenous people in voluntary isolation who have defended, often by force, their protected isolation from the outside world.

The area is patrolled by the Indian Navy. 
 
Nominally, the island belongs to the South Andaman administrative district, part of the Indian union territory of Andaman and Nicobar Islands. In practice, Indian authorities recognise the islanders' desire to be left alone, restricting outsiders to remote monitoring (by boat and sometimes air) from a reasonably safe distance; the Indian government will not prosecute the Sentinelese for killing people in the event that an outsider ventures ashore. The island is a protected area of India. In 2018, the Government of India excluded 29 islands – including North Sentinel – from the Restricted Area Permit (RAP) regime, in a major effort to boost tourism. In November 2018, the government's home ministry stated that the relaxation of the prohibition on visitations was intended to allow researchers and anthropologists (with pre-approved clearance) to finally visit the Sentinel islands.

The Sentinelese have repeatedly attacked approaching vessels, whether the boats were intentionally visiting the island or simply ran aground on the surrounding coral reef. The islanders have been observed shooting arrows at boats, as well as at low-flying helicopters. Such attacks have resulted in injury and death. In 2006, islanders killed two fishermen whose boat had drifted ashore, and in 2018 an American Christian missionary was killed after bribing local fishermen to transport him to the island.

Geography

North Sentinel is surrounded by coral reefs, and lacks natural harbours. The entire island, other than the shore, is forested. There is a narrow, white-sand beach encircling the island, behind which the ground rises , and then gradually to between  near the centre.

Flora and fauna 
The island is largely covered in tropical and subtropical moist broadleaf forest. Due to the lack of surveys, the exact composition of the terrestrial flora and fauna remain unknown. In his 1880 expedition to the island, Maurice Vidal Portman reported an open, "park-like" jungle with numerous groves of bulletwood (Manilkara littoralis) trees, as well as huge, buttressed specimens of Malabar silk-cotton tree (Bombax ceiba). Indian boar (Sus scrofa cristatus) are apparently found on the island and a major food source for the Sentinelese, with reports by Portman referring to a "huge heap" of pig skulls near a Sentinelese village. The IUCN Red List lists North Sentinel as being an important habitat for coconut crabs (Birgus latro), which have been otherwise extirpated from most of the other Andaman Islands except from South Sentinel and Little Andaman. North Sentinel Island, along with South Sentinel, is also considered a globally Important Bird Area (IBA) by BirdLife International, as despite the lack of surveys, the pristine habitat likely supports a diversity of birdlife.

The marine life surrounding the island have also not been well surveyed. A large coral reef is known to circle the island, and mangroves are also known to fringe its banks. A c. 1999 report from divers near the island indicate that the reefs around the island were bleached in the 1998 El Niño, but had since seen new growth of coral. Sharks have allegedly also been seen in the waters off the island. Sea turtles likely also occur near the island, as Portman referred to them also being a major food source for the Sentinelese and one was sighted on a 1999 survey of the surrounding waters. Dolphins were also sighted on the same survey.

History

The Onge, one of the other indigenous peoples of the Andamans, were aware of North Sentinel Island's existence; their traditional name for the island is Chia daaKwokweyeh. They also have strong cultural similarities with what little has been remotely observed amongst the Sentinelese. However, Onges brought to North Sentinel Island by the British during the 19th century could not understand the Sentinelese language, so a significant period of separation is likely.

British visits
British surveyor John Ritchie observed "a multitude of lights" from an East India Company hydrographic survey vessel, the Diligent, as it passed by the island in 1771. Homfray, an administrator, travelled to the island in March 1867.

Towards the end of the same year's summer monsoon season, Nineveh, an Indian merchant ship, was wrecked on a reef near the island. The 106 surviving passengers and crewmen landed on the beach in the ship's boat and fended off attacks by the Sentinelese. They were eventually found by a Royal Navy rescue party.

Portman's expeditions 
An expedition led by Maurice Vidal Portman, a government administrator who hoped to research the natives and their customs, landed on North Sentinel Island in January 1880. The group found a network of pathways and several small, abandoned villages. After several days, six Sentinelese, an elderly couple and four children, were taken to Port Blair. The colonial officer in charge of the operation wrote that the entire group, "sickened rapidly, and the old man and his wife died, so the four children were sent back to their home with quantities of presents". A second landing was made by Portman on 27 August 1883 after the eruption of Krakatoa was mistaken for gunfire and interpreted as the distress signal of a ship. A search party landed on the island and left gifts before returning to Port Blair. Portman visited the island several more times between January 1885 and January 1887.

After Indian independence

Indian exploratory parties under orders to establish friendly relations with the Sentinelese made brief landings on the island every few years beginning in 1967. In 1975 Leopold III of Belgium, on a tour of the Andamans, was taken by local dignitaries for an overnight cruise to the waters off North Sentinel Island.  The cargo ship MV Rusley ran aground on coastal reefs in mid-1977, and the MV Primrose did so in August 1981.  The Sentinelese are known to have scavenged both wrecks for iron.  Settlers from Port Blair also visited the sites to recover the cargo.  In 1991, salvage operators were authorised to dismantle the ships.

After the Primrose grounded on the North Sentinel Island reef on 2 August 1981, crewmen several days later noticed that some men carrying spears and arrows were building boats on the beach.  The captain of Primrose radioed for an urgent drop of firearms so his crew could defend themselves. They did not receive any because a large storm stopped other ships from reaching them, but the heavy seas also prevented the islanders from approaching the ship.  A week later, the crewmen were rescued by a helicopter under contract to the Indian Oil And Natural Gas Corporation (ONGC).

The first peaceful contact with the Sentinelese was made by Triloknath Pandit, a director of the Anthropological Survey of India, and his colleagues on 4 January 1991. Although Pandit and his colleagues were able to make repeated friendly contact, dropping coconuts and other gifts to the Sentinelese, no progress was made in understanding the Sentinelese language, and the Sentinelese repeatedly warned them off if they stayed too long. Indian visits to the island ceased in 1997.

The Sentinelese survived the 2004 Indian Ocean earthquake and its after-effects, including the tsunami and the uplifting of the island. Three days after the earthquake, an Indian government helicopter observed several islanders, who shot arrows and threw spears and stones at the helicopter. Although the tsunami disturbed the tribal fishing grounds, the Sentinelese appear to have adapted.

In January 2006, two Indian fishermen, Sunder Raj and Pandit Tiwari, were fishing illegally in prohibited waters and were killed by the Sentinelese when their boat drifted too close to the island. There were no prosecutions.

In November 2018, John Allen Chau, a 26-year-old American missionary trained and sent by Missouri-based All Nations, was killed during an illegal trip to the restricted island, planning to "preach Christianity" to the Sentinelese. Seven individuals were taken into custody by Indian police on suspicion of abetting Chau's illegal access to the island. Entering a radius of  around the island is illegal under Indian law. The fishermen who illegally ferried Chau to North Sentinel said they saw tribesmen drag his body along a beach and bury it. Despite efforts by Indian authorities, which involved a tense encounter with the tribe, Chau's body was not recovered. Indian officials made several attempts to recover the body but eventually abandoned those efforts. An anthropologist involved in the case told The Guardian that the risk of a dangerous clash between investigators and the islanders was too great to justify any further attempts.

Demographics
North Sentinel Island is inhabited by the Sentinelese, indigenous people in voluntary isolation who defend their isolation by force. Their population was estimated to be between 50 and 400 people in a 2012 report. India's 2011 census indicates 15 residents in 10 households, but that too was merely an estimate, described as a "wild guess" by the Times of India.

Like the Jarawas whose numbers have been decreasing, the Sentinelese population would face the potential threats of infectious diseases to which they have no immunity, as well as violence from intruders. The Indian government has declared the entire island and its surrounding waters extending  from the island to be an exclusion zone to protect them from outside interference.

Political status
The Andaman and Nicobar (Protection of Aboriginal Tribes) Regulation, 1956 provides protection to the Sentinelese and other native tribes in the region. The Andaman and Nicobar Administration stated in 2005 that they have no intention to interfere with the lifestyle or habitat of the Sentinelese and are not interested in pursuing any further contact with them or governing the island. Although North Sentinel Island is not legally an autonomous administrative division of India, scholars have referred to it and its people as effectively autonomous, or independent.

References

External links

 The Sentinelese People – history of the Sentinelese and of the island
 Brief factsheet about the indigenous people of the Andaman Islands by the Andaman & Nicobar Administration (archived 10 April 2009)
 "The Andaman Tribes: Victims of Development"
 Video clip from Survival International
 Photographs of the 1981 Primrose rescue

Autonomous regions of India
Islands of South Andaman district
Islands of the Bay of Bengal
Lands inhabited by indigenous peoples
Populated places in India
Islands of India